Telotristat ethyl (USAN, brand name Xermelo) is a prodrug of telotristat, which is an inhibitor of tryptophan hydroxylase. It is formulated as telotristat etiprate — a hippurate salt of telotristat ethyl.

On February 28, 2017, the U.S. Food and Drug Administration (FDA) approved telotristat ethyl in combination with somatostatin analog (SSA) therapy for the treatment of adults with diarrhea associated with carcinoid syndrome that SSA therapy alone has inadequately controlled. Telotristat ethyl was approved for use in the European Union in September 2017.

The U.S. Food and Drug Administration (FDA) considers it to be a first-in-class medication.

Pharmacology
Telotristat is an inhibitor of tryptophan hydroxylase, which mediates the rate-limiting step in serotonin biosynthesis.

Adverse effects
Common adverse effects noted in clinical trials include nausea, headache, elevated liver enzymes, depression, accumulation of fluid causing swelling (peripheral edema), flatulence, decreased appetite, and fever. Constipation is also common, and may be serious or life-threatening (especially in overdose).

Formulations 
It is marketed by Lexicon Pharmaceuticals (as telotristat etiprate). 328 mg telotristat etiprate is equivalent to 250 mg telotristate ethyl.

References

Further reading

External links 
 
 

Amines
Ethyl esters
Guanidines
Chloroarenes
CYP3A4 inducers
Trifluoromethyl compounds
Phenethylamines
Prodrugs
Pyrazoles
Aminopyrimidines
Tryptophan hydroxylase inhibitors